Highway H17 is a Ukrainian national highway (H-highway) connecting the city of Lviv with Lutsk.

Main route
Main route and connections to/intersections with other highways in Ukraine.

See also

 Roads in Ukraine
 Ukraine Highways
 International E-road network
 Pan-European corridors

References

External links
 National Roads in Ukraine in Russian
 European Roads in Russian

Roads in Volyn Oblast
Roads in Lviv Oblast